The 2000 Robert Morris Colonials football team represented Robert Morris College, now Robert Morris University, as a member of the Northeast Conference (NEC) during the 2000 NCAA Division I-AA football season. The Colonials were led by 7th-year head coach Joe Walton and played their home games at Moon Stadium on the campus of Moon Area High School. The Colonials finished the 2000 season with their fifth consecutive NEC championship.

Schedule

Game summaries

Buffalo State

To open the season, the Colonials hosted the Buffalo State Bengals, from Buffalo State College (SUNY College at Buffalo) at Moon Stadium, on the campus of Moon Area High School. The two teams had met three times before, with Robert Morris winning their first meeting in 1997 and Buffalo State taking the following two in 1998 and 1999.

The season-opening contest got off to a relatively slow start offensively, as Robert Morris kicker Jeff Carlo successfully converted two field goals, from 20 and 21 yards, to put the Colonials on the scoreboard first in the 2000 season. Their narrow lead was soon eclipsed, as Buffalo State's Brandon Janesz found the end zone on a 1-yard rush, and a PAT from Ryan Cox put the Bengals in front by one. The teams traded touchdowns in the second quarter, as RMU quarterback Tim Levcik found Sam Dorsett for an 8-yard touchdown before Buffalo State's Chris Henry capped a 99-yard touchdown drive by converting an 8-yard rush to put the Bengals back up top. The Bengals' lead would not stand for long; Jeff Carlo's 55-yard field goal, a kick that broke the school record (held by Carlo himself) by five yards, gave the halftime advantage to the Colonials, 16–14.

The third quarter's only score came in the form of a Robert Morris touchdown, as Tim Levcik tossed his second touchdown pass of the game, this time to Opio Gary for fifteen yards. Robert Morris led 23–14 going into the game's final quarter, and the lead was extended by RMU running back Dante Settles, as he netted 30 of his 46 rushing yards on a touchdown dash that all but sealed the game. Buffalo State was able to find the end zone one final time, as Chris Henry found Lamar Wilson for a 15-yard touchdown pass, but the two-point conversion was not successful. There was no further scoring, and the Colonials won by a score of 30–20. This win improved the Colonials to 8–0 all-time in home openers, and to 2–2 against Buffalo State.

References

Robert Morris
Robert Morris Colonials football seasons
Northeast Conference football champion seasons
College football undefeated seasons
Robert Morris Colonials football